San Francisco quintet Crime In Choir was an instrumental progressive rock band. Founded in 2000, Crime In Choir released their previous full-length releases on Frenetic Records (2004's The Hoop) and Omnibus (2002's self-titled debut), respectively. The band's third full-length, Trumpery Metier, was recorded by Tim Green, and is their first release for Gold Standard Labs.  The band includes two original members of At the Drive-In, guitarist Jarrett Wrenn and bassist Kenny Hopper.

On September 13, 2007, Crime in Choir performed at the San Francisco Museum of Modern Art accompanied by light projections by visual artist, Anthony McCall.

Crime in Choir's fourth release, "Gift Givers" was released on 22 January 2009 on Kill Shaman Records - their previous label (Gold Standard Labs) closed its doors in October 2007.

Current members
 Kenny Hopper - Rhodes piano, bass guitar
 Jesse Reiner - synthesizers (Moog and analog)
 Jarrett Wrenn - electric guitar, baritone guitar
 Warren Huegel - drums
 Matt Waters - saxophone
 Jonathan Skaggs - bass guitar
 Tim Green - Guitar

Former members
 Zach Hill - drums
 Ian Hill - drums
 Carson McWhirter - bass, electric guitar, keyboards
 Jeff Hunt - bass, Dan Electro baritone guitar
 Jay Pellicci - Drums

Discography
Crime in Choir — 2002 (Omnibus)
The Hoop — 2004 (Frenetic) 2005 (Moorworks, Japan)
Trumpery Metier — 2006 (Gold Standard Labs)
Gift Givers - 2009 (Kill Shaman)

References

External links
Official site
SFWeekly profile

American instrumental musical groups
Rock music groups from California